Eisenhower and Lutz is an American sitcom which aired for thirteen episodes on CBS from March 14 to June 20, 1988.

Overview
The series stars Scott Bakula as Barnett M. "Bud" Lutz, Jr., a shiftless ambulance-chasing lawyer. Lutz had trouble getting clients, so his father (Henderson Forsythe) added the name "Eisenhower" to his shingle to attract clientele. Lutz spent more time trading quips with the women in his life–Megan (DeLane Matthews) and K.K. (Patricia Richardson)–than he did actual legal work.

Creator Allan Burns later used three actors from this series—Matthews, Richardson and Geter—on his 1989 NBC sitcom FM.

Cast
 Scott Bakula as Barnett M. "Bud" Lutz, Jr
 Henderson Forsythe as Barnett M. "Big Bud" Lutz
 DeLane Matthews as Megan O'Malley
 Patricia Richardson as Kay "K.K." Dunne
 Leo Geter as Dwayne Spitler
 Rose Portillo as Millie Zamora

Episodes

External links
 

1988 American television series debuts
1988 American television series endings
1980s American sitcoms
1980s American legal television series
1980s American workplace comedy television series
CBS original programming
Television shows set in Palm Springs, California
English-language television shows
Fictional American lawyers
Television series by MTM Enterprises